Maria Ehrich (born 26 February 1993) is a German actress. She appeared in more than twenty films since 2003 including her role as Gwendolyn "Gwen" Shepard in the Ruby Red film series based on the book.

Selected filmography

Awards
2015: Goldene Kamera newcomer award

References

External links
 

1993 births
Living people
Actors from Erfurt
German film actresses
German television actresses